Denmark Township is one of twelve townships in Emmet County, Iowa, United States.  As of the 2000 census, its population was 588.

History
Denmark Township was created in 1883. It was named in honor of a group of Danish families who had arrived shortly before the establishment of the township.

Geography
According to the United States Census Bureau, Denmark Township covers an area of 35.5 square miles (91.94 square kilometers).

Cities, towns, villages
 Ringsted

Unincorporated towns
 Forsyth at 
(This list is based on USGS data and may include former settlements.)

Adjacent townships
 Armstrong Grove Township (north)
 Swea Township, Kossuth County (northeast)
 Seneca Township, Kossuth County (east)
 Fenton Township, Kossuth County (southeast)
 Independence Township, Palo Alto County (south)
 Vernon Township, Palo Alto County (southwest)
 Jack Creek Township (west)
 Swan Lake Township (northwest)

Cemeteries
The township contains these three cemeteries: Ringsted Memorial, Saint Johns Lutheran and Saint Pauls.

Major highways
  Iowa Highway 15

School districts
 Armstrong-Ringsted Community School District

Political districts
 Iowa's 4th congressional district
 State House District 7
 State Senate District 4

References
 United States Census Bureau 2008 TIGER/Line Shapefiles
 United States Board on Geographic Names (GNIS)
 United States National Atlas

External links
 US-Counties.com
 City-Data.com

Danish-American culture in Iowa
Townships in Emmet County, Iowa
Townships in Iowa